Jacob Daniel Tipper (born 2 December 1991) is a British cyclist, who currently rides for UCI Continental team .

Major results
2015
 5th Overall Tour of Al Zubarah
1st Prologue
 6th Overall Sharjah International Cycling Tour
2017
 1st  Team pursuit, National Track Championships (with Daniel Bigham, Charlie Tanfield and Jonathan Wale)
 2nd GP Oued Eddahab, Les Challenges de la Marche Verte
 9th Trophée de la Maison Royale, Challenge du Prince
2018
 1st Stage 6 Tour du Maroc
 1st Stage 11 Tour of Qinghai Lake
 2nd Team pursuit, National Track Championships

References

External links

1991 births
Living people
English male cyclists
Sportspeople from Dudley